The Steppe Arena (Mongolian: Степпе Арена), is an indoor ice hockey arena in Ulaanbataar, Mongolia.

The ice rink is built per proposed standards from the International Olympic Committee which provides the opportunity to host both international and continental games.

Construction
The International Ice Hockey Federation met with Mongolian President Khaltmaagiin Battulga in 2018 to discuss on the possibility of building an ice rink in Mongolia.

The groundbreaking ceremony for the Steppe Arena on 14 April 2019 was led by Puntsagiin Tsagaan, founder and chairman of the Board of Steppe Arena LLC, and President Battulga. Construction progress amidst the COVID-19 pandemic and later opened in a ceremony led by President Ukhnaagiin Khürelsükh on 29 September 2021.

Architecture and design
In 2018, Steppe Arena LLC launched a project to build an indoor ice hockey rink in country as their first project. They tasked local firm Anagram LLC to work on the architectural plan of the indoor arena and they were aided by the Embassy of Canada in Mongolia who provided connections with architects who were experienced in building similar large-scale sports facility. Steppe Arena LLC signed cooperation memorandums with Canadian firms DA Architecture Limited and HDR | CEI Architecture Associates to help them work on the project allowing the design team to study ice rinks of varying scale in Canada.

The Mongolian architects who worked on the building preferred a modern design for the arena and did not want to draw inspiration from historical references such as the country's yurts. The structure did incorporate indigenous influence such as Mongolian traditional-style pillars.

Facilities
It has five changing rooms for athletes and referees and meeting rooms which can accommodate 80 to 100 people.

References

External links

Ice hockey venues in Mongolia
Indoor arenas in Mongolia
Sports venues completed in 2021